The 2006 League of Ireland Premier Division was the 22nd season of the League of Ireland Premier Division. The division was made up of 12 teams. Shelbourne were champions while Derry City finished as runners-up. However Shelbourne were subsequently demoted to the First Division and had to withdraw from the 2007–08 UEFA Champions League and 2007 Setanta Sports Cup because of their financial difficulties.

Club information

Overview
The Premier Division season kicked off on 10 March and concluded on 17 November. The season saw several clubs face financial difficulties. The Revenue Commissioners took High Court action and threatened to have Shelbourne wound up after it failed to pay more than €104,000 in outstanding taxes. Shelbourne also struggled to pay its players during the season. In July Dublin City also went out of business and withdrew from the league, unable to complete the season. Their results were expunged from the record which benefited both Cork and Derry who had dropped points to them. However Shelbourne's off field problems did not prevent them from winning the title. Mark Farren's stoppage-time winner for Derry City away to Waterford United on 13 November ensured that for the third successive year the title would be decided on the final day of the season. Shelbourne clinched the title with a 2–1 win over Bohemians at Tolka Park. Jason Byrne and Glen Crowe scored the vital goals. However Shelbourne's celebrations were cut short when the league decided to demote them to the First Division. They also withdrew from the 2007–08 UEFA Champions League and 2007 Setanta Sports Cup because of their financial difficulties.

Final table

Results

Matches 1–20

Matches 21–30

Promotion/relegation play-off
Dundalk who finished second in the 2006 League of Ireland First Division played off against Waterford United who finished eleventh in Premier Division.
1st Leg

2nd Leg

Dundalk won 3–2 on aggregate but did not meet the criteria set out by the FAI's Independent Assessment Group and were not promoted.

Independent Assessment Group
In March 2006 it was announced that the League of Ireland and the FAI would be merging. As part of this arrangement the league would be restructured and membership of the 2007 Premier Division and 2007 First Division would be decided by an Independent Assessment Group established by John Delaney and chaired by a former FAI honorary secretary, Des Casey. Former Republic of Ireland international footballer, Niall Quinn was originally a member of the group. However he later withdrew because of his growing commitments to Sunderland A.F.C. He was replaced by Richard Collins, a former chairman of and current director of Charlton Athletic. Other members of the group included John Fitzgerald, the former city manager of Dublin City Council and Pat O'Neill, a former chairman of the Irish Sports Council. The IAG effectively performed a financial stress test on the League of Ireland member clubs. Clubs were assessed on their past five season record in the league. Crucially though, clubs would also be graded on off-field criteria, including attendance, infrastructure, governance, strategic planning, finance, youth development and marketing. The IAG announced their results in December 2006. However the final outcome of the IAG decision was further complicated by the financial difficulties of Shelbourne who, despite initially passing the stress test, were subsequently relegated to the First Division. This provided a reprieve for Waterford United, ranked at thirteen by the IAG, who were selected to replace them.

IAG Table

Notes

UEFA coefficient
The League of Ireland Premier Division's UEFA coefficient accumulated to a total value of 6.498 for the 2006–07 European season.
League's 2006 UEFA ranking
 33  Finland
 34  Moldova
 35  Ireland
 36  Georgia
 37  Liechtenstein

Top-scorers

Awards
SWAI eircom League Player of the Month award

PFAI eircom League Player of the Year award
 Joseph Ndo – Shelbourne

PFAI eircom League Young Player of the Year award
 Kevin Deery – Derry City

TV3's Goal of the Season award
 Kevin Deery – Derry City

Attendances
Premier Division games had an average attendance of 1,539 people. Derry City's average home attendance of 3,127 was the highest of any league team for the season. The record for the highest attendance in the Premier Division was also set in the Brandywell Stadium on the last night of the season when Derry City met Cork City. 6,080 attended the game.

Gallery

See also
 2006 Shelbourne F.C. season
 2006 League of Ireland First Division
 2006 League of Ireland Cup

References

 
1
Ireland
Ireland
1
League of Ireland Premier Division seasons